Baloch Quetta Football Club is a professional football club based in Quetta, Pakistan. It last competed in Pakistan Premier League, after gaining promotion from 2020 PFF League.

History 
In the 2005–06 PFF National League, Baloch Quetta made its PFF debut against Pakistan Police which they lost. In the 2009–10 PFF League, Baloch Quetta ended up at first and qualified for semi-finals. They defeated Muslim FC in the semi-final but lost to Young Blood in final. In the 2013 PFF League, Baloch Quetta promoted to Pakistan Premier League for the first time. They made their PPL debut in the 2014–15 Pakistan Premier League. However they won no match and were relegated to the next PFF League. The next PFF League was held in 2020 where Baloch Quetta won the final and were promoted to the 2021 Pakistan Premier League, but later withdrew.

Honours 

 PFF League
 Champions (1): 2020

References 

Football clubs in Pakistan
Pakistan Premier League
Association football clubs established in 2004
2004 establishments in Pakistan
Football in Quetta